Dog Tales is a 1958 Warner Bros. Looney Tunes animated cartoon directed by Robert McKimson. The short was released on July 26, 1958.

Plot
The cartoon consists of a series of blackout gags involving dogs (e.g., one in which a doberman pinscher viciously pinches an overweight U.S. Army private identified as "Doberman" (a reference to, and caricature of, the character played by Maurice Gosfield on The Phil Silvers Show); and another in which the narrator can't make up his mind whether the dog pictured is a pointer or a setter, and then finally shows a picture of a "point-setter"). A basset hound declares that she's a TV star (a reference to Cleo the Dog, from the contemporary TV sitcom The People's Choice, who was also voiced by Mary Jane Croft), we learn the unusual breed of a Newfoundland puppy's grandfather, and a great dane named "Victor Barky" plays the piano. Reused animation from Chuck Jones' Often an Orphan (1949) and Friz Freleng's Piker's Peak (1957) is also seen here. In the former case, Charlie Dog makes a cameo - his final appearance in a Warner Bros. cartoon as well as his only cartoon to not be directed by Chuck Jones.

One gag is a backhanded reference to Disney's animated feature, "Lady and the Tramp", which was released around three years before this short.  The narrator (Robert C. Bruce) solemnly intones "Today, the dog appears in countless varieties of artificially produced breeds," while the screen shows drawings of a Russian Wolfhound, an English Bulldog, an American Cocker Spaniel, a Pekingese, a Chihuahua, a Scottish Terrier, and a Dachshund—all of them nearly identical in their 'artificial' depiction to dogs from the Disney film (Boris, Bull, Lady, Peg, Pedro, Jock, and Dachsie), where they all (with the exception of Peg, played by Peggy Lee) speak English with stereotypical accents associated with their breeds' countries of origin.

References

External links
 
 
 

1958 animated films
1958 short films
1958 films
1950s Warner Bros. animated short films
Films scored by Milt Franklyn
Films directed by Robert McKimson
Looney Tunes shorts
Animated films about dogs
Animation based on real people
1950s English-language films
Charlie Dog films